Karin Schlüter (born 12 March 1937) is a German equestrian and Olympic medalist. She was born in Hamburg. She competed in dressage at the 1972 Summer Olympics in Munich, and won a silver medal with the German team, along with Liselott Linsenhoff and Josef Neckermann.

References

External links 
 

1937 births
Living people
Sportspeople from Hamburg
German female equestrians
Olympic equestrians of West Germany
Olympic silver medalists for West Germany
Equestrians at the 1972 Summer Olympics
Olympic medalists in equestrian
Medalists at the 1972 Summer Olympics